This article includes statistics of Boca Juniors all-time top goal scorers.

Martín Palermo is Boca Juniors all time goal scorer with 236 goals, 193 of those goals were scored in Argentine Primera División tournaments and the other 43 in International tournaments.

Palermo is also the club's top international scorer with 43 goals, followed by Rodrigo Palacio with 28.

All time top scorers

All official tournaments
Note: Only goals in official competitions are included.

League goals

Last updated on: September 29, 2013 – Top 20 league scorers at historiadeboca.com.ar

International goals

Last updated on: May 29, 2013 – Top 20 international scorers at historiadeboca.com.ar

Top scorers per season
Those players that are bolded were also the Top Scorers of that championship.

Most frequent Boca top scorers

Notes

References
Club's Top scorers per season - Agrupación Nuevo Boca
Boca Players - Historia de Boca
Historical Top scorers - Agrupación Nuevo Boca 

    
Association football player non-biographical articles
Boca